The German Chainsaw Massacre - The First Hour of the Reunification (German: Das deutsche Kettensägenmassaker), also known as Blackest Heart in the United States, is a 1990 German horror film written and directed by Christoph Schlingensief and starring Karina Fallenstein, Alfred Edel, Udo Kier and Irm Hermann. It is the second film in Schlingensief's Deutschlandtrilogie (German Trilogy).

Plot
The film depicts events around the German reunification of 1990 and focuses on a group of East-Germans who cross the border to visit West-Germany and get slaughtered by a psychopathic West German cannibal family with chainsaws who want to turn them into sausages.

Cast
  as Alfred
  as Clara
 Artur Albrecht as Ihr Liebhaber
 Susanne Bredehöft as Ihr Mann / Margit
 Brigitte Kausch as Brigitte
 Volker Spengler as Henk
 Dietrich Kuhlbrodt as Dietrich
 Reinald Schnell as Kurti
 Udo Kier as Jonny
 Eva-Maria Kurz as Zöllnerin
 Irm Hermann as DDR-Grenzerin

Production
Schlingensief conceived the idea for the film after he had viewed bootleg copies of The Texas Chain Saw Massacre and its sequel The Texas Chainsaw Massacre 2 (which were both banned in Germany) and found the second film to be "superb for its richness in imagery and double entendres". He wrote the script in a matter of days after the German reunification.

Reception

Time Out lauded the film as "abrasive, relentless, cruelly funny and enjoyably deranged." The film was leveled with a legal complaints of "glorification of violence" upon its release in Germany. Sean Leonard of HorrorNews.net calling it "an artsy, gory horror movie in the vein of Tobe Hooper’s classic", with the director's pointed social commentary.

See also
 The Texas Chainsaw Massacre franchise
 List of German films of the 1990s

References

External links
 

1990 horror films
1990 films
German horror films
West German films
German splatter films
German reunification
1990s German-language films
1990s German films